Lamoria clathrella is a species of snout moth in the genus Lamoria. It was described by Ragonot in 1888, and is known from Madagascar, La Réunion and Mauritius.

The larvae feed on Eugenia jambolana.

References

Moths described in 1888
Tirathabini
Moths of Madagascar
Moths of Mauritius
Moths of Réunion